Canton is a city in and the county seat of Van Zandt County in East Texas, United States. It is located about 40 miles west of Tyler. As of the 2020 census, the city had a population of 4,229.

The city sustained severe damage on April 29, 2017, from several tornadoes, and two years later from another tornado that struck downtown on May 29, 2019, both of which occurred just before First Monday Trade Days, the popular flea market extravaganza which draws thousands to the city each month.

History 

Canton was surveyed as early as 1840 by a company of men under Dr. W. P. King. The community stands on the original survey of Jesse Stockwell, an early settler in the area. No settlement was made until 1850, when the town was laid out and named by settlers moving from Old Canton in Smith County, Texas. The first district courthouse at Canton opened in 1850, and a post office, the county's fourth, was established in that year.

In the resulting dispute in 1877, armed residents of Canton went to Wills Point to recover the records, and the county judge wired Governor Richard B. Hubbard for aid. The Texas Supreme Court finally decided in favor of Canton. Unwilling to use the railroad at Wills Point, Canton businessmen established Edgewood,  to the northwest of town, and built an extension to the railroad at a siding formerly called Stevenson.

Property for the town's first school, the Canton Academy, was acquired in 1853. Sid S. Johnson began publication of the Canton Weekly Times, the county's first newspaper, in 1860. A Grange was founded in 1876.  By 1890, Canton had a population of 421, flour mills, sawmills, cotton gins, and a bank. Brick buildings were under construction by 1892, and a new brick courthouse was completed in 1894. Iron ore and anthracite coal were discovered in 1887 and 1891. By 1896, the town reached a population high of 800 and had several churches, a steam gristmill and gin, two weekly newspapers, three general stores, and two hotels, but the population had fallen back to 421 by 1904.

Canton was incorporated in 1919, and elected a mayor and aldermen. Despite the Great Depression, development of the Van oilfield after 1929 brought further expansion.  A Public Works Administration project in the 1930s had the completion of a new courthouse. In 1933, area schools registered 500 white and 28 black students. The population reached 715 in 1940, but dwindled again after 1949. In the 1950s, local business included a sweet-potato curing plant, an ice factory, a concrete-tile factory, lumberyards, and a cotton gin. Expansion of the Canton city limits doubled its territory in the 1960s. In 1970, the community had a municipal lake with recreational facilities, seven churches, a school, a bank, a library, a newspaper, and 86 businesses. The population doubled between 1960 and 1970 from roughly 1,000 to 2,000, and reached nearly 3,000 by 1990. The population was 3,292 in 2000. However, when the city council decided to recount the population, they found that the town had 5,100 residents instead of the previous census total of 3,292.

Canton is known for its First Monday Trade Days. According to various sources, the tradition began with district court meetings held on the first Monday of each month, or with the monthly visit of neighbors during the days of the Confederate States of America. The custom began with the swapping of surplus stock by barter and grew to include casual bargaining for or swapping of dogs, antiques, junk, and donkeys on a  grounds. It is so immensely popular that Canton goes from a town of 5,100 to a town of over 300,000 during each First Monday weekend, making it the largest flea market in the world. In the past, due to the success of First Monday, the city of Canton had no property tax. However, as of 2006, that is no longer the case.

Canton also holds the Van Zandt County Fair and Rodeo and an Annual Bluegrass Festival, which takes place in August. Between 2003 and 2007, Canton was the host community for the United States Equestrian Drill Championship (Super Ride), which showcases top color guard and mounted drill teams from throughout the country.

On April 29, 2017, the city and county sustained severe damage from four tornadoes. One of these tornadoes was rated EF4, making it one of the two strongest tornadoes of the year. Reports of four fatalities and dozens of injured prompted opening of displacement shelters as a disaster declaration was made for Van Zandt County.  Texas Governor Greg Abbott ordered state resources to the area to offer assistance to local officials.

On May 29, 2019, the city and county sustained extensive damage from a tornado that struck the downtown area, near First Monday Trade Days. No deaths or injuries occurred, but several houses and local businesses were severely damaged or destroyed. The tornado struck the intersection of Texas State Highways 19 and 64.

Geography 

Canton is located at  (32.553576, –95.866710).

According to the United States Census Bureau, the city has a total area of 5.6 square miles (14.6 km2), of which 5.2 square miles (13.4 km2) of it are land and 0.4 square miles (1.1 km2) of it is covered by water (7.80%).

Demographics 

As of the 2020 United States census, there were 4,229 people, 1,682 households, and 922 families residing in the city.

Education 

The City of Canton is served by the Canton Independent School District. It is classified as a 4A school district, by the University Interscholastic League. Canton High School Eagle athletics include football, girls' volleyball, cross country, basketball, power lifting, track and field, golf, tennis, softball, and baseball. Canton is also known for the CISD band program coined the "Mighty Band from Eagle Land".

Notable people 

 Colten Brewer, professional baseball player 
 Calvin Graham was the youngest U.S. serviceman in WWII enlisting at the age of 12. He served aboard the USS South Dakota
 James S. Hogg, who once served as district attorney in Van Zandt County, was elected governor in 1890
 Jerry Hunt, composer, established IRIDA Records there in 1979
 G. J. Kinne, professional football coach and former player
 Keavon Milton, former professional football player
 Van Zandt, Townes, singer-songwriter who wrote numerous songs considered masterpieces of American songwriting.

Popular culture 
On July 21, 2008, Stephen Colbert made a comment on The Colbert Report about John McCain making a campaign stop in Canton, Ohio, and "not the crappy Canton in Georgia." The comment resulted in a local uproar, which prompted Colbert to apologize for the story during his July 30, 2008, show. This began a running gag on the show in which he would apologize to one town and make several jokes at the expense of another town named Canton, then repeat the cycle a week later. He went on to insult Canton, Kansas, (drawing the ire of Kansas governor Kathleen Sebelius), and Canton, South Dakota, before turning his attention to Canton, Texas, on August 12, 2008. After apologizing to the people of Canton, South Dakota, Colbert called Canton, Texas, an "incorporated outhouse" and "one steaming pile of longhorn dung." This jab at the Texas town had been predicted by Governor Sebelius at the end of her July 31, 2008 remarks.  In response to Colbert's comments, a Canton, Texas, city councilman joked that he wanted Colbert to come there so he could "mash his nose". On October 28, Colbert turned his attention back to Canton, Ohio, after Barack Obama made a campaign stop there, forcing Colbert to find it "crappy".

References

External links
 City of Canton, TX official website
 First Monday Trade Days in Canton Texas
 KWJB RADIO broadcasting from City of Canton, TX official website

Cities in Texas
Cities in Van Zandt County, Texas
County seats in Texas
Populated places established in 1850
1850 establishments in Texas